Vihara Satya Dharma (Chinese: 保安宮)  is a modern Chinese temple at Benoa Port, Bali. It is a temple of the Three teachings ("Tridharma") of Chinese folk religion,  i.e. Buddhism, Taoism, and Confucianism. Furthermore, like the other Chinese temples in Bali, this temple also has an altar in its outdoor yard dedicated to Gods of Balinese Hinduism.

The main deity of this temple is Tian Shang Sheng Mu, the Goddess who can calm the sea and ensure the safety of those travelling across the seas. As a temple which is built in the international port area, this temple worships the Deities of travel safety, sailing, and business. This is the first Chinese temple in Benoa Port thus is expected to be a worship place for the sailors from various countries and also as a tourist attraction.

Naming
"Satya Dharma" (Sanskrit) means "True Law". "Vihara" is a Sanskrit term traditionally used for Buddhist temples in Southeast Asia, but it is also used occasionally for Chinese temples, otherwise called klenteng, since the New Order dispositions. Even though Confucianism has recently been accepted as a legal religion in Indonesia, many new Chinese temples in Bali still use the term "vihara" in their names.

"Vihara Satya Dharma" is translated in Chinese characters as 宮安保, from the right to the left readable as bǎo ān gōng. 保 (bǎo) means "to protect" while 安 (ān) means "content, quiet, peace", thus 安保 (ānbǎo) means "to maintain security". The 宮 (gōng) character means "temple, palace". Literally, Bao An Gong means the "Temple to Maintain Security". It is a common term for any Chinese temples in Indonesia which intends the safety of its followers, especially in the spiritual meaning.

History
Vihara Satya Dharma is located at the north end of Benoa Port Highway. The temple foundation got the construction fund from the donation of worshippers from Indonesia especially Bali, even from Japanese, Taiwanese and Thai sailors. The construction lasted for 6 years until it was inaugurated in 2012. The inauguration celebration was held on 22 August 2012 and was attended by the Deputy Governor of Bali, i.e. AA Ngurah Puspayoga.

Altars

Gallery

See also
 Kim Tek Ie Temple (金德院), Jakarta
 Vihara Bahtera Bhakti (安卒大伯公廟), Jakarta
 Boen Tek Bio (文德廟), Tangerang
 Tay Kak Sie Temple (大覺寺), Semarang
 Sanggar Agung (宏善堂), Surabaya
 Hoo Ann Kiong Temple (護安宮), Riau
 Ban Hin Kiong Temple (萬興宮), Manado
 Gunung Timur Temple (東嶽觀), Medan

References

Temples in Indonesia